The JFK 50 Mile or the JFK 50 Mile Memorial is an ultramarathon that takes place annually in Washington County, Maryland, United States. The first race was held on 30 March 1963, one of numerous  races that year. After the Kennedy assassination, many of these events were never held again.

The current course records are held by Hayden Hawks (5:18:40) for men and Ellie Greenwood (6:12:00) for women.

The race starts in the town of Boonsboro, Maryland, and heads east out of town toward the South Mountain Inn. The first 2.3 miles are on a hardball road, which leads to the Appalachian Trail. The Appalachian Trail piece is approximately 13 miles. The trail then continues on the Chesapeake and Ohio Canal for 26.3 miles, following the canal to Dam #4 on the Potomac River. The final leg of the Race follows 8.4 miles of hardball roads to Williamsport, Maryland.

The Race is held on the Saturday before Thanksgiving.

The current race director is Mike Spinnler.

History 
The JFK 50 was founded in 1963 by William Joseph “Buzz” Sawyer Jr. (1928-2019). It was initially a private club event of the boys of the Cumberland Valley Athletic Club based in Hagerstown, Maryland. With all the 50-mile hikes taking place across the country in 1963, Sawyer decided to organize his own hike for the Club. The 50-miler took place on March 30, 1963, and was called the “CVAC 50 Mile Hike.” The original route started at Boonsboro Junior High School and ended at St. James School in Hagerstown. Ten boys and Sawyer started. Only three boys finished, all age 16, together with Sawyer in 13:10.

References

External links
JFK 50 Mile website
JFK 50 – America’s Oldest Ultramarathon

Ultramarathons in the United States
Tourist attractions in Washington County, Maryland